Kjell-Erik Karlsson (born 4 February 1946) is a Swedish Left Party politician, member of the Riksdag 1998–2006.

References

1946 births
20th-century Swedish politicians
21st-century Swedish politicians
Living people
Members of the Riksdag 1998–2002
Members of the Riksdag 2002–2006
Members of the Riksdag from the Left Party (Sweden)
Place of birth missing (living people)